Sycacantha ngoclinhana is a moth of the family Tortricidae. It is found in Vietnam.

The wingspan is about 18.5 mm. The ground colour of the forewings is pale brownish sprinkled and suffused with brown. The posterior costal area is tinged pink. The hindwings are pale greyish brown.

Etymology
The name refers to the type locality.

References

Moths described in 2009
Olethreutini
Sycacantha
Moths of Asia
Taxa named by Józef Razowski